Strzelecki Highway is a short 55 kilometre highway that connects the towns of Leongatha and Morwell. It was named after the Strzelecki Ranges, the set of low mountain ridges the road travels through.

History
The passing of the Transport Act of 1983 (itself an evolution from the original Highways and Vehicles Act of 1924) provided for the declaration of State Highways, roads two-thirds financed by the State government through the Road Construction Authority (later VicRoads). The Strzelecki Highway was declared a State Highway in December 1990, from Leongatha to Morwell; before this declaration, the road was referred to as Leongatha-Yarragon Road, Mountain Hut Road, and Morwell-Thorpdale Road.

Strzelecki Highway was signed as State Route 182 between Leongatha and Morwell in 1990; with Victoria's conversion to the newer alphanumeric system in the late 1990s, it was replaced by route B460.

The passing of the Road Management Act 2004 granted the responsibility of overall management and development of Victoria's major arterial roads to VicRoads: in 2008, VicRoads re-declared the road as Strzelecki Highway (Arterial #6180) between the South Gippsland Highway in Leongatha and Commercial Road at Morwell.

The Morwell end of the highway was deviated westwards in 2006 as part of the Hazelwood Power Station West Field open cut mine expansion.

Major intersections

See also

 Highways in Australia
 Highways in Victoria

References

Highways in Australia